Coyote Creek is a stream in Tehama County, in the U.S. state of California. The stream runs for  before it empties into Oat Creek.

According to tradition, Coyote Creek was named for a single coyote which was considered a nuisance by ranchers before it could be shot.

References

Rivers of California
Rivers of Tehama County, California